Salt Lick is a home rule-class city in Bath County, Kentucky, in the United States. The population was 303 at the 2010 U.S. Census.

History
The community at the present site of Salt Lick was originally named Vail when the first post office was established in 1882. The town was laid out and renamed in 1884; the post office followed suit four years later after the city was formally incorporated.

Geography
Salt Lick is located at  (38.119555, -83.616069), at the intersection of US 60 and KY 211 beside the Licking River. It is part of the Mount Sterling micropolitan area.

Demographics

As of the census of 2000, there were 342 people, 130 households, and 89 families residing in the city. The racial makeup of the city was 99.12% White, 0.58% Native American, and 0.29% from two or more races.

There were 130 households, out of which 35.4% had children under the age of 18 living with them, 56.9% were married couples living together, 10.0% had a female householder with no husband present, and 30.8% were non-families. 23.8% of all households were made up of individuals, and 9.2% had someone living alone who was 65 years of age or older. The average household size was 2.63 and the average family size was 3.21.

In the city, the population was spread out, with 30.1% under the age of 18, 5.3% from 18 to 24, 32.2% from 25 to 44, 19.6% from 45 to 64, and 12.9% who were 65 years of age or older. The median age was 35 years. For every 100 females, there were 102.4 males. For every 100 females age 18 and over, there were 102.5 males.

The median income for a household in the city was $26,042, and the median income for a family was $27,159. Males had a median income of $35,313 versus $24,643 for females. The per capita income for the city was $10,584. About 16.1% of families and 26.4% of the population were below the poverty line, including 36.4% of those under age 18 and 15.4% of those age 65 or over.
As of the census[2] of 2000, there were 342 people, 130 households, and 89 families residing in the city. The racial makeup of the city was 99.12% White, 0.58% Native American, and 0.29% from two or more races.

There were 130 households, out of which 35.4% had children under the age of 18 living with them, 56.9% were married couples living together, 10.0% had a female householder with no husband present, and 30.8% were non-families. 23.8% of all households were made up of individuals, and 9.2% had someone living alone who was 65 years of age or older. The average household size was 2.63 and the average family size was 3.21.

In the city, the population was spread out, with 30.1% under the age of 18, 5.3% from 18 to 24, 32.2% from 25 to 44, 19.6% from 45 to 64, and 12.9% who were 65 years of age or older. The median age was 35 years. For every 100 females, there were 102.4 males. For every 100 females age 18 and over, there were 102.5 males.

The median income for a household in the city was $26,042, and the median income for a family was $27,159. Males had a median income of $35,313 versus $24,643 for females. The per capita income for the city was $10,584. About 16.1% of families and 26.4% of the population were below the poverty line, including 36.4% of those under age 18 and 15.4% of those age 65 or over.

Notable Natives

References

External links
Salt Lick community website

Cities in Bath County, Kentucky
Cities in Kentucky
Mount Sterling, Kentucky micropolitan area